Catherine Lowe Besteman is an abolitionist educator at Colby College, where she holds the Francis F. Bartlett and Ruth K. Bartlett Chair in Anthropology. Her research and practice engage the public humanities to explore abolitionist possibilities in Maine. She has taught at that institution since 1994. 

Her research has focused on security, militarism, displacement, and community-based activism and transformation, primarily based in Somalia, South Africa, and the U.S. Her work has been supported by the American Council of Learned Societies, the National Endowment for the Arts, Wenner-Gren, and with a Guggenheim Fellowship. She has held other fellowships at the Institute of Advanced Study in Durham, UK, the Institute of Advanced Study at Stellenbosch University, Bellagio, and the School for Advanced Research, among others.

She also curates art exhibitions and public humanities initiatives, including Freedom & Captivity, a statewide collaborative public humanities initiative to envision and foster abolitionist visioning in Maine, and Making Migration Visible, a statewide arts-based initiative to change the narratives around migration in Maine. 

Her work has been acknowledged with the 2021 Public Anthropologist Award (for Militarized Global Apartheid), the 2019 SANA (Society for the Anthropology of North America) Prize for Distinguished Achievement in the Critical Study of North America, and a Leeds Honor Book Award (for Transforming Cape Town). 

She has published four monographs and eight edited or co-edited volumes. She taught previously at Queens College-CUNY.

Early life and education
Besteman received her BA from Amherst College, and her MA and PhD from the University of Arizona.

Career

Besteman’s areas of expertise include refugees, southern Somalia, South Africa, and, more generally, insecurity and violence, and inequality and racism. She also specializes in studying humanitarianism and activism. She writes in support of an engaged approach to anthropology, which involves advocacy, teaching, and collaboration with the people who are the focus of study. Besteman has studied Southern Somalia extensively, and has written a number of books and papers about this area. She has criticized traditional anthropological and media portrayals of Somalis and of the Somalian civil war since it began in the early 1990s,.

Research and work 

Besteman began working in southern Somalia in the late eighties before the outbreak of civil war in 1991.    Many refugees from the communities where she had worked in Somalia have resettled in Lewiston, Maine.  Under her direction, members of the local Bantu community and Colby College students have produced a wiki-type website about the Somali Bantus of Lewiston. A museum exhibition: "Rivers of Immigration: Peoples of the Androscoggin" was mounted at the Museum L-A, in conjunction with the wiki project, from 2009 to 2010.

During the 2000s, Besteman studied Cape Town, South Africa, focusing on the work of grassroots organizations in the city after the end of apartheid. Her book Transforming Cape Town (2008) describes several of these organizations and contrasts incidents of traditionalism with those of innovation.

Besteman received a Guggenheim Foundation grant and an American Council of Learned Societies (ACLS) Fellowship in 2012 to work on a book project. In late 2013, the Rockefeller Foundation awarded her a residency for spring 2014.

Besteman has co-edited three books for general readership with Hugh Gusterson: Why America’s Top Pundits are Wrong: Anthropologists Talk Back (2005), The Insecure American: How We Got Here and What We Should Do About It (2009), and Life By Algorithms: How Roboprocesses Are Remaking Our World (2019).

Selected publications

Books 
 Besteman, C. (2020). Militarized Global Apartheid. Duke University Press.
 Besteman, C. & Gusterson, H. (Eds) (2019) Life by Algorithms: How Roboprocesses Are Remaking Our World. University of Chicago Press.
 Besteman, C. (2016). Making Refuge: Somali Bantu Refugees and Lewiston, Maine. Duke University Press
 Gusterson, H. & Besteman, C.L. (Eds.). (2009). The Insecure American: How We Got Here and What We Should Do About It. University of California Press.
 Besteman, C. (2008). Transforming Cape Town. University of California Press.
 Besteman, C. L., & Gusterson, H. (Eds.). (2005). Why America's Top Pundits Are Wrong: Anthropologists Talk Back. University of California Press.
 Besteman, C. L. (Ed.). (2002). Violence: A Reader. New York University Press.
 Besteman, C. (1999). Unraveling Somalia: Race, Violence, and the Legacy of Slavery. University of Pennsylvania Press.
 Besteman, C., & Cassanelli, L. V. (1996). The Struggle for Land in Southern Somalia: the War Behind the War. Westview Press.

Papers 
 Besteman, C. (2019). On Ethnographic Unknowability. In Carole Ann McGranahan, ed., Scholars and Writers: Writing Anthropology, Ethnography, and Beyond. Durham, NC: Duke University Press.	
 Besteman, C. (2019). Refuge and Security Panics. Public Anthropologist 1(1):  41-61.
 Besteman, (2019). C. Militarized Global Apartheid. Current Anthropology, Volume 60, Supplement 19: S26-S38.
 Besteman, C. (2019). Costs of War in Somalia. Costs of War, Brown University, https://watson.brown.edu/costsofwar/papers/2019/costs-war-somalia
 Besteman, C. (2019). Remaking the World. In C. Besteman and H. Gusterson, eds., Life by Algorithm: How Roboprocesses Are Remaking Our World, Chicago: University of Chicago Press.  
 Besteman, C. (2019). Hostile Charity: Somali Refugees and Risk in a New Security Age. In Erica Caple James, ed., Governing Gifts, Faith, Charity, and the Security State. Santa Fe, NM: School of Advanced Research Press.   
 Besteman, C. (2018). Exiting Violence: The Uses and Abuses of Memory. In Fondation Maison des Sciences de L’Homme, International Panel on Exiting Violence (with Bridget Conley, Francisco Ferrandiz, Molly Minden, Scott Straus, Ron Suny, Natan Sznaider, and Baskara Wardaya).
 Besteman, C. (2018). Somalia's Southern War: The Fight Over Land and Labor. In M. Keating and M. Waldman, eds., War and Peace in Somalia: National Grievances, Local Conflict, and Al-Shabaab, London: Hurst and Co. and Oxford University Press, (with D. Van Lehman).
 Besteman, C. (2017). Experimenting in Somalia: The New Security Empire. Anthropological Theory 17(3): 404-420.
 Besteman, (2015). C. Ethnography of a Somali Ethnographic Photography Archive in Maine. In A. Gubrium, K. Harper, and M. Otañez, eds., Participatory Visual and Digital Research in Action. Walnut Creek, CA: Left Coast Press.
 Besteman, C. (2014). On Ethnographic Love. In R. Sanjek, ed., Mutuality. Philadelphia: University of Pennsylvania Press.	
 Besteman, C. (2014). Refuge Fragments, Fragmentary Refuge. Ethnography 15(4): 426-445.  
 Besteman, C. (2013). Three Reflections on Public Anthropology. Anthropology Today 29(6): 3-6.
 Besteman, C. (2013). Somali Bantus in a State of Refuge. Bildhaan: An International Journal of Somali Studies 12: 11-33. 
 Besteman, C. (2012). Translating Race Across Time and Space: The Creation of Somali Bantu Ethnicity. Identities: Global Studies in Culture and Power 19(3): 1-18.
 Besteman, C. (2011). Cultural / Social Anthropology and Ethnography. In J. E. Miller and O. Schmid, eds., How to Get Published: A Guide for Anthropology Students and Young Professionals. Lanham MD: AltaMira Press1.
 Besteman, C. (2010). In and Out of the Academy: Policy and the Case for a Strategic Anthropology. Human Organization, 69(4), 407-417.
 Besteman, C. (1998). Primordialist blinders: A reply to IM Lewis. Cultural Anthropology, 13(1), 109-120.
 Besteman, C. (1996). Representing violence and "othering" Somalia. Cultural Anthropology, 11(1), 120-133.
 Besteman, C. (1996). Violent politics and the politics of violence: the dissolution of the Somali nation‐state. American Ethnologist, 23(3), 579-596.
 Besteman, C. (1994). Individualisation and the assault on customary tenure in Africa: title registration programmes and the case of Somalia. Africa-London-International African Institute, 64, 484-484.

References

External links 
 Catherine Besteman’s Colby College web page: http://www.colby.edu/directory_cs/clbestem/
 Freedom & Captivity web page: https://www.freedomandcaptivity.org/
 Making Migration Visible web page: https://www.meca.edu/about/institute-of-contemporary-art/past-exhibitions/making-migration-visible/
 Museum L-A Rivers of Immigration web page: https://web.archive.org/web/20131029033157/http://museumla.org/Rivers-of-Immigration
 The Somali Bantu Experience: From East Africa to Maine wiki: http://wiki.colby.edu/display/AY298B
 Network of Concerned Anthropologists website: http://sites.google.com/site/concernedanthropologists/home

Year of birth missing (living people)
Living people
American anthropologists
American women anthropologists
Amherst College alumni
University of Arizona alumni
Colby College faculty
American women academics
21st-century American women